Cameron Forbes is an Australian journalist and author. Born in Rockhampton in Queensland on 1 September 1938. He worked for The Age as Europe correspondent and became foreign editor of The Age in the early 1980s.  In the late 80s, Forbes was posted in Singapore as Asia correspondent. He was also Washington correspondent for The Australian from 1997 to 2000. 

Cameron has reported from conflict zones in Northern Ireland, Portugal, Middle East, Rwanda, Myanmar, Kashmir, Sri Lanka, Afghanistan and Bougainville.

Notable interviews include Nelson Mandela, Desmond Tutu, Cardinal Sin, Prince Sihanouk, Rajiv Gandhi, Benazir Bhutto, Benjamin Netanyahu, Aung San Suu Kyi, Cory Aquino, George W. Bush, Bill Clinton and many other politicians, dignitaries, rebel leaders and insurgents including those in the council of the Taliban and Tutsi rebels.

An outstanding journalist known for his perceptive overseas coverage, he has been the recipient of many awards including:

 1986 - Graham Perkin Australian Journalist of the Year Award
 1990 - The Canadian Award for International Reporting
 1991 - The United Nations Association Media Peace Award
 2010 - Walkley Award for Most Outstanding Contribution to Journalism

Retiring from print journalism in 2002, he has written a number of non-fiction books, including Hellfire: The Story of Australia, Japan and the Prisoners of War.

Books
Hellfire: The Story of Australia, Japan and the Prisoners of War (Pan Macmillan 2005)
Under the Volcano: The Story of Bali (Black Inc. Publishing 2007)
The Korean War: Australia in the Giants Playground (Pan Macmillan 2010)
Australia on Horseback: The story of the horse and the making of a nation (Pan Macmillan 2014)

References

Living people
Year of birth missing (living people)
People from Rockhampton
Walkley Award winners